5O or 5-O may refer to:

 ASL Airlines France (IATA airline code: 5O)
 5-O-caffeoylquinic acid, see Chlorogenic acid
 5-O-(4-coumaroyl)-D-quinate 3'-monooxygenase
 5-O-Methylations
 Cyanidin 3-O-rutinoside 5-O-glucosyltransferase
 [[Anthocyanin 5-O-glucoside 6'-O-malonyltransferase]]
 a slang term for a Ford Mustang GT automobile with a 5.0 L engine5.0'', 2010 album by Nelly

See also 
 Five-O (disambiguation)
 O5 (disambiguation)
 50 (disambiguation)